Silene schafta, the Caucasian campion or autumn catchfly, is a species of flowering plant in the family Caryophyllaceae, native to western Asia.

The specific epithet schafta derives from a local Caspian name for this plant.

Valued in the garden as easily grown groundcover for rock gardens, Silene schafta has gained the Royal Horticultural Society's Award of Garden Merit.

References

Flora of Asia
schafta